"Swalla" is a song by American singer Jason Derulo featuring Nicki Minaj and Ty Dolla $ign, released on February 24, 2017, by Warner Bros. Records. The song was written by the artists alongside LunchMoney Lewis, Robert Diggs, Jacob Kasher Hindlin, Russell Jones. and producer Ricky Reed. The song was originally intended to be the first single from Derulo's fifth studio album, then titled 777.

Background and release
Derulo previewed "Swalla" in a video posted in August 2016. He officially announced it as a single on January 2, 2017. "Swalla" premiered on February 23, 2017, and was released for download on iTunes Store the next day. While talking about the song on the red carpet of the 59th Grammy Awards, Derulo said:

"I never believe in forcing a collaboration. You know, I’m a fan of both of theirs and I thought that they fit the track perfectly. It’s one of those ones that’ll get you up and doing your thing. I feel like it’s gonna stick out on the radio. There’s nothing that sounds like it."

Parts of the chorus are created as an interpolation of ODB's song "Shimmy Shimmy Ya".

On May 12, 2017, the trio released "Swalla (After Dark Remix)", a slow-paced acoustic remix of the original song. In an interview with The Fader, Derulo said about the remix: "It was so nice we had to do it twice! The original version is the ultimate club track, so the idea was to give people the flip side of the song. The subject matter and melody is so sexy, but you might miss the 'sexy' in all the fun of 'Swalla'. So, 'After Dark' is on the opposite side of the spectrum and is SURE to set the mood."

Critical reception
Justin Ivey from XXL wrote that Minaj "comes through to close out the track with bars that steal the show". Joshua Espinoza of Complex wrote that "Jason and Ty handle their verses nicely, but Nicki is definitely the star", also saying that the song "definitely has potential". Rap-Up also praised Minaj's verse saying that she "anchors the track with a third and final verse that many will likely assume is another thinly-veiled jab at Remy Ma". Hilary Hughes from MTV News wrote that this is a "steamy number that has all three chiming in over a wobbly beat that would feel right at home on the floor of a beach club in the Caribbean".

Music video
On February 24, 2017, the official lyric video for "Swalla", directed by Alex Lockett, was uploaded to Derulo's YouTube channel. The music video premiered on March 17, 2017. As of June 2021, the music video has received over 1.6 billion views on YouTube.

Live performances
Derulo and Ty Dolla $ign performed the song live on The Tonight Show Starring Jimmy Fallon on April 6, 2017. Derulo and Nicki Minaj performed the song at the Billboard Music Awards on May 21, 2017. Derulo performed the song at the Opening Ceremony of Pakistan Super League 2018 on February 22, 2018. On April 12, 2018, Derulo performed the song live during a medley with "Tip Toe" and "Colors" at the German Echo Music Prize.

Other appearance
This song is featured in Blackpink's In Your Area World Tour as the group member Lisa's solo dance number in Asia, North America and Europe setlist.

It is announced that this song will appear in Produce X 101 as one of the dance evaluation songs along with "Believer" by Imagine Dragons and "Finesse" by Bruno Mars and Cardi B.

Track listing
Digital download
"Swalla" (featuring Nicki Minaj and Ty Dolla Sign) – 3:36

Digital download
"Swalla" (Wideboys Remix) (featuring Nicki Minaj and Ty Dolla Sign) – 3:16

Digital download
"Swalla" (After Dark Remix) (featuring Nicki Minaj and Ty Dolla Sign) – 4:32

Charts

Weekly charts

Year-end charts

Certifications

References

External links
 

2017 songs
2017 singles
Jason Derulo songs
Nicki Minaj songs
Ty Dolla Sign songs
Warner Records singles
Dancehall songs
Songs written by Jason Derulo
Songs written by Nicki Minaj
Songs written by Ty Dolla Sign
Songs written by Ricky Reed
Songs written by Jacob Kasher
Songs written by LunchMoney Lewis
Songs written by Ol' Dirty Bastard
Songs written by RZA
Number-one singles in Israel